Ishak, Ishaq or Eshaq (/ ALA-LC: Isḥāq) is a surname and masculine given name, the Arabic form of Isaac. Ishak (Isaac) was the son of Ibrahim (Abraham) and Sarah, patriarchs in the Bible and the Quran. The name Ishak means ‘One who laughs’ because Sarah laughed when the angel told them that they would get a child (since she was very old).

People with this given name
Sheikh Ishaaq bin Ahmed,an Sharif Islamic scholar and was the forefather and common ancestor of the Somali Isaaq clan-family in the Horn of Africa
 İshak Alaton, Turkish businessman
 Ishak Belfodil, Algerian footballer
 Ishaq Bux, Indian actor
 Ishaq Dar, Pakistani politician
 Ishak Efendi, Ottoman engineer and translator
 Ishak Haleva, Turkish rabbi
 Eshaq Jahangiri (born 1957), Iranian politician
 Ishak Ali Moussa, Algerian footballer
 Ishak Haji Muhammad, Malaysian writer
 Ishaq Shahryar, Afghan politician
Early Islamic era
 Ishaq ibn Ibrahim, (died 750) was the Umayyād prince and son of caliph Ibrahim ibn al-Walid.
 Ishaq ibn Musa al-Hadi, was an Abbasid prince and son of Caliph al-Hadi.
 Ishaq al-Mawsili, (767–850) was an Arab musician of Persian origin
 Ishaq ibn Rahwayh, (778–852) was an early Islamic scholar.
 Ishaq Ibn Imran, (died 903) was an Arab physician during Abbasid era.
 Ishaq Al-Ruhawi 9th-century Arab physician and the author of the medical ethics book in Arabic medicine.
 Ishaq ibn Ibrahim, (died July 850) was the chief of security (Shurtah) in Baghdad during the Abbasid era.
 Ishaq ibn Kundaj, Abbasid general and governor
 Ishaq ibn al-Muqtadir,  (died March 988) was an Abbasid prince and father of caliph Al-Qadir (r. 991–1031)
 Ishaq ibn al-Muttaqi, was an Abbasid prince and son of caliph of Baghdad Al-Muttaqi, who ruled from 940 to 944.

People with this surname
Early Islamic era
 Ibn Abi Ishaq, first grammarian of the Arabic language
 Ibn Ishaq (or Muḥammad ibn Isḥāq ibn Yasār ibn Khiyār), Arab Muslim historian who wrote a biography of Muhammad
 Muhammad ibn Ishaq, (850–851) was the chief of security (Shurtah) in Baghdad during Abbasid era.
 Hunayn ibn Ishaq, (809–873) was Nestorian Christian translator, scholar, physician, and scientist. During the Islamic Abbasid era, he worked with a group of translators.
 Baba Ishak, 13th century Turkish rebel and false Prophet.
Modern times
 Aziz Ishak, Malaysian freedom fighter, politician and journalist
 Mikael Ishak, Swedish footballer
 Mustapha Ishak Boushaki, Algerian cosmologist
 Mohammad Ishaq, Pakistani cricketer
 Samar Ishaq, Pakistani footballer
 Sara Ishaq, a Scottish-Yemeni film maker
 Shahril Ishak, Singaporean footballer
 Yusof bin Ishak, Singaporean politician
 Zunera Ishaq, Canadian woman in niqab controversy

See also
 Isaac, in Judaism and Christianity
 Isaac in Islam (Prophet Ishaq)
 Ishak (disambiguation)

Arabic-language surnames
Arabic masculine given names
Turkish masculine given names